The women's scratch race at the 2007 Dutch National Track Championships in Alkmaar took place at Sportpaleis Alkmaar on December 28, 2007. 27 riders competed in the contest.

Race
The initial qualification heats were won by Ellen van Dijk and Vera Koedooder. The gold medal macht was won by Marianne Vos ahead of Adrie Visser and Elise van Hage.

Competition format
Due to the number of entries the competition started with a qualification round. The qualification round included two heats and the top 12 riders of each heat qualified for the final race.

Results

Qualification round
The top 12 athletes of each semi-final advanced to the final match.

Heat 1

Heat 2

Qualification results.

Final (top 10)

Final results

References

2007 Dutch National track cycling championships
Dutch National Track Championships – Women's scratch